Woo is a 1998 romantic-comedy film directed by Daisy V.S. Mayer and starring Jada Pinkett Smith in the title role. Tommy Davidson also co-stars.

Plot
Darlene "Woo" Barnes (Smith), an extroverted woman living in New York City, is notoriously talented at turning men into mush. When Woo's psychic friend Celestrial (Girlina) predicts that the man of her dreams is about to enter her life, Woo doesn't believe it is true. Celestrial is convinced that Woo is destined to meet a tall, debonair Virgo. Woo's cousin Claudette (Paula Jai Parker) and Claudette's boyfriend Lenny (Dave Chappelle) plan to spend the night together but find themselves entertaining Woo instead. Lenny begs his best friend Tim Jackson (Davidson) to take Woo out, but the shy, strait-laced law clerk Tim contrasts the sassy and brassy Woo. The same night, Lenny and Claudette's night goes wrong when his obsession with chicken drives her to be forced to dress up as a sexy but awkward "chicken ho" (he makes her cluck and walk like a chicken) but she is allergic to feathers.

At first, Woo is unconcerned about the matchmaking mismatch, but when told that Tim is a Virgo, she decides it is fate, jumps at the chance, and immediately heads for Tim's apartment. Meanwhile, Tim, who can't believe his luck, goes next door to his neighbor Darryl (LL Cool J) for tips on romancing women. Darryl supplies Tim with incense, edible body oils, and a tape of sexy songs. When Woo arrives, Tim is completely smitten. Woo, however, discovers that Tim is far from her imagined sexy, spontaneous stud. Seeing through Tim's pseudo-cool act, she humiliates and teases him. They are just about to leave Tim's apartment when Tim is visited by three of his pals: Frankie (Duane Martin), Hop (Darrel Heath), and Romaine (Michael Ralph). The trio's chauvinistic attitude irritates Woo, so she retaliates and freaks them out by acting insane. Finally, the date gets underway. Woo and Tim arrive at a stuffy Italian restaurant, but Woo's behavior gets them thrown out. They go to a dance club, where Tim is punched out by Woo's ex-boyfriend, whom Woo punches back. Tim repeatedly suffers many other misfortunes, but Woo realizes that Tim is the guy she wants. After Tim gets his car back, it is smashed to pieces. Woo offers to share her car and her life with Tim.

Cast
 Tommy Davidson - Tim Jackson
 Jada Pinkett Smith - Darlene "Woo" Barnes 
 Dave Chappelle - Lenny
 Paula Jai Parker - Claudette
 LL Cool J - Darryl
 Darren Heath - Hop
 Duane Martin - Frankie
 Dartanyan Edmonds - Shakim
 Girlina - Celestrial
 Lance Slaughter - Lamar
 Michael Ralph - Romaine
 Paula Jai Parker 
 Tiffany Hall - Denise
 Foxy Brown - Fiance
 Nicci Gilbert - Crayola
 Aida Turturro - Tookie
 Joanna Bacalso - Stunning Woman
 Lenny Solomon - Violin Player
 Jsu Garcia - Maitre d'
 Philip Akin - Roger Smith
 Natalie Venetia Belcon - Hootchie
 Buddy Lewis - Bartender
 Nicci Gilbert - Crayola
 Orlando Jones - Sticky Fingas
 Billy Dee Williams - Himself

Reception
The film was met with negative reviews from audiences and critics. It holds a 10% fresh rating at Rotten Tomatoes, based on 40 reviews, with an [average score of 3.53/10. Derek Armstrong at Allmovie, while giving positive reviews to stars Davidson and Smith's performances, stated that the script was "formulaic", and that the film in general was "not much of a vehicle for its impish starlet." Made on a budget of $13 million, the film  grossed $8,064,972 domestically, making it a box-office flop. It was, however, a success when released on home video.

Soundtrack

A soundtrack containing hip hop and R&B music was released on May 5, 1998 through Epic Records. It peaked at #52 on the Billboard 200 and #8 on the Top R&B/Hip-Hop Albums.

References

External links

1998 films
1998 romantic comedy films
African-American films
Films directed by Daisy von Scherler Mayer
Films scored by Michel Colombier
New Line Cinema films
American romantic comedy films
1990s English-language films
1990s American films